Erigeron allocotus  is a species of flowering plant in the family Asteraceae known by the common name Bighorn fleabane. It has been found only in the Bighorn Mountains of north-central Wyoming and southern Montana.

Erigeron allocotus is a short, branching shrub rarely more than 18 cm (7 inches) tall. Leaves are 3-lobed. The inflorescence generally consists of 2 or 3 flower heads per stem, each head with sometimes as many as 40 small yellow disc florets and surrounded by a ring of up to 40 white or blue ray florets.

References

External links
photo of herbarium specimen at Missouri Botanical Garden, collected in Wyoming in 1936, isotype of Erigeron allocotus

allocotus
Flora of Montana
Plants described in 1937
Flora of Wyoming
Flora without expected TNC conservation status